Off the Map is an American medical drama television series created by Jenna Bans, who also served as an executive producer together with Shonda Rhimes and Betsy Beers. The series ran on ABC from January 12, 2011 to April 6, 2011. The series was filmed in Puerto Rico and on Oahu, Hawaii, using many of the production facilities remaining from the ABC series Lost (2004–10).

On May 13, 2011, ABC cancelled the series after one season.

Premise
Set in a remote South American village, seven doctors search for the reasons that brought each of them to medicine.

Cast and characters

Main
 Martin Henderson as Dr. Benjamin "Ben" Keeton: Keeton is "one of the world's greatest humanitarians", according to Mina and Lily. He was married to Abby and they had a daughter together, but they died during an accident. However, in episode 4 it is revealed that Abby is on life support in the San Miguel Hospital and Ben is keeping her on life support because her trust fund bankrolls the clinic. When EEG scans show no change, Ben must make the decision whether or not to keep his wife on life support. He became involved with Dr. Ryan Clark some time after the accident, and they have mostly been on and off. When asked by Brenner how long they've been dating, his words were, "About a year. On and off. We fight, then we make up". Ben starts to realize he must move on with his life and allows himself to commit to Ryan on a deeper level. When she has to go to New York for a full investigation regarding her heart disease, he decides to temporarily leave the clinic behind and leave with her. In episode 12 Hold on tight he fires Mina for lying to him about being Clark's doctor.
 Jason Winston George as Dr. Otis Cole: It is said about Cole that his bark is "just as bad as his bite". Although he is strict while working, off the job he can be extremely silly. He is good friends with Zee, and although they started out as friends with benefits, he realizes he is falling in love with her after she breaks up with him. Cole was once addicted to morphine and heroin and consumes candy to stay clean. When Cole and Minard must retrieve heroin to use as painkillers, he contemplates relapsing, carrying around a stash of heroin for a whole day, before coming clean to Ben, who then takes his heroin and gives him some more candy.
 Valerie Cruz as Zitajalehrena "Zee" Toledo Alvarez: Zee is the mother hen of the doctors. She shows disapproval towards workplace romances but has developed a casual relationship with Cole. When she finds out it is more a friends with benefits thing for Cole, she ends things between them, but finds herself drawn back in when he is injured during a rescue mission. They are currently contemplating getting back together and try a real relationship.
 Caroline Dhavernas as Dr. Lily Brenner: Brenner's fiancé was killed in a cycling accident after she asked him to go out and get her some cereal. She has an attraction to Ben Keeton, although this was set back by her disapproval at his handling of a patient in "A Doctor Time Out", and is completely ended once she discovers Keeton has gotten back together with Clark. She meets a local farmer named Mateo at the local bar and forms a relationship with him, until she discovers that he and his family grow coca on their land, which is used to make cocaine. Brenner is an extreme control freak and finds it difficult at first to adapt to the unexpected situations in the jungle that regularly break her routine.
 Zach Gilford as Dr. Tommy Fuller: Tommy is shown to be a promiscuous and light-hearted character who incurred Cole's wrath quite early on, earning the nickname "Plastics". He is shown to have "barely made his way through medical school" according to Cole. Tommy had a brief crush on Ryan, until he found out she was dating Keeton. He had a relationship with a local girl named Alma, but due to lack of knowledge of each other's language, he finds it difficult to be around her. He eventually gets drunk and sleeps with Minard, after which things become awkward for them. In the episode 11 "Everything As It Should Be" Tommy gets jealous when a patient, Pher becomes involved with Mina. He tells Brenner this and she says go for it, when he does he finds Mina in the shower with Pher. Tommy is shown to be upset when he sees Mina and Pher together. He is upset when he realizes that Mina's relationship is more than sex and eggs. In the season finale he finally tells Mina that he has fallen in love with her.
 Mamie Gummer as Dr. Mina Minard: Mina is a doctor who "only works solo" and loses confidence easily due to a misdiagnosis earlier in her career that led to the death of a patient, a little boy named Eric. She is highly competitive at work. She owns a chicken named Dinner that was given to her by a grateful patient. In episode 4 Mina says that her father is the head of a major Boston hospital, and when she misdiagnosed Eric he wiped her resume clean of the incident. She appears to have some kind of attraction to Cole after they share some close moments. In episode 8, Mina sleeps with Tommy while she is drunk after a party for her new god-daughter. In episode 12 Hold on tight Mina becomes Ryan's doctor without Keeton knowing. At the end of the episode Keeton fires Mina for lying to him and will never let her be Ryan's doctor.
 Rachelle Lefevre as Dr. Ryan Clark: Ryan's parents were missionaries, and she grew up all over the world. She was bitten by an assassin bug when she was eight years old which went untreated causing her to develop Chagas disease. Twenty years later, the disease has caused irreversible heart damage and leads her to going into heart failure. She is in an on and off again relationship with Ben Keeton, although he eventually fully commits to her once he realizes it is time for him to move on from his past. When he discovers the truth about Ryan's condition, he is worried sick, which leads to both of them declaring their love for each other. When Ryan has to go to New York for her heart to get her on a transplant list, she is joined by Ben at the airport, who decides to come with her.
 Jonathan Castellanos as Charlie: When Charlie was 9, his parents abandoned him. He now works at the clinic, and "supposedly" lives in a hostel. It is shown that he actually house-sits condos for 6 months a year, and has a bed under a lab in the clinic as well. He is good friends with both Tommy and Cole. Charlie has a crush on Brenner and was worried that she did not know his name. Charlie has given voice to the titles of episode 3 and 4.

Recurring
 Nicholas Gonzalez as Mateo
 Aimee Garcia as Alma
 Elizabeth Peña as Inez

Episodes

Release

International broadcasts 
In Canada, Off the Map was aired on Global HD. Although never screened on British television, it became available on-demand through the ABC Studios channel on Sky in 2015.

Home releases 
On June 3, 2011, it was announced that ABC Studios would release the complete series on DVD in Region 1. The set, including all 13 episodes, as well as bonus features, was eventually made available on August 20, 2011.

Reception

Critical reception
On the review aggregator website Rotten Tomatoes, 18% of 22 critics' reviews are positive, with an average rating of 5.90/10. The website's consensus reads, "Off the Map is dreadfully painful in its efforts to be dramatic and earnest." Metacritic, which uses a weighted average, assigned the television series a score of 49 out of 100, based on 21 critics, indicating "mixed or average reviews".

Ratings
Off the Map premiered with 7.57 million viewers. It became ABC's highest viewed telecast in the timeslot since the premiere of Eastwick on September 23, 2009, and its second episode on September 30, 2009.

Accolades 
The series received a nomination for Best Primetime Television Program, with Jonathan Castellanos being nominated as well for Best Supporting Actor - Television, at the 2011 Imagen Foundation Awards

References

External links

2010s American drama television series
2010s American medical television series
2011 American television series debuts
2011 American television series endings
American Broadcasting Company original programming
American action adventure television series
American action television series
American adventure television series
English-language television shows
Television series by ABC Studios
Television shows set in South America
Television shows filmed in Hawaii
Television shows filmed in Puerto Rico
Television series by Shondaland